Longton railway station is a railway station in England at Longton, Stoke-on-Trent. The station is served by trains on the Crewe to Derby Line which is also a community rail line known as the North Staffordshire line. The station is owned by Network Rail and managed by East Midlands Railway. The full range of tickets for travel are purchased from the guard on the train at no extra cost.

History
The station was opened on 7 August 1848 by the North Staffordshire Railway. It is located on an embankment opposite the town hall and next to a cantilever bridge, which is a local landmark. A ticket office is located in a walkway underneath the station but has been locked out of use since the early 1990s.

In 2003 a new bus station was built adjacent to the railway station and named Longton Transport Interchange. Nearby, new commercial premises have been built, including a large Tesco Extra supermarket.

To the west of the station is Foley Crossing signal box.

Facilities
Like most stations on the line, the station is unstaffed and facilities are limited. There are no ticket issuing facilities at the station and the full range of tickets can be purchased on board the train at no extra cost.

There is a small cycle rack at the entrance to the station as well as a chargeable car park.

Step free access is not available to either of the platforms at Longton.

Services
All services at Longton are operated by East Midlands Railway.

During the late evenings, services terminate at Nottingham instead of Newark Castle.

On Sundays, the station is served by an hourly service between Crewe and Derby only although no trains operate before 14:00.

References

Further reading

External links

 Page with more info on the station

Railway stations in Stoke-on-Trent
DfT Category F2 stations
Former North Staffordshire Railway stations
Railway stations in Great Britain opened in 1848
Railway stations served by East Midlands Railway